Lygniodes proutae is a moth of the family Erebidae. It is found in the Philippines (Mindanao).

References

Moths described in 1924
Lygniodes
Moths of the Philippines